Federico Frezzi (Foligno, 14th century - Konstanz, 1416) was Italian poet and bishop.

He entered the Dominican order, studied in Florence, he became professor of theology in various Italian universities and gathered various important positions in church. In year 1403 Frezzi became bishop of Roman Catholic Diocese of Foligno, he was also a member of council of Constance. The most important work of poetry of Frezzi is long didactic epic Il Quadriregio, imitating Dante's Divine Comedy.

References

External links
 

1416 deaths
Italian poets
Italian male poets
Bishops of Foligno
Year of birth unknown
15th-century Italian Roman Catholic bishops